The Buick V8 is a family of  V8 engines produced by the Buick division of General Motors between 1953 and 1981. The first version replaced the Buick straight-eight. All are naturally aspirated OHV pushrod engines, except for an optional turbocharged version of the short-lived 215 used in the 1962-63 Oldsmobile Jetfire.

Some of these Buick V8s, such as the 350, 400, and 455, had the same displacements as those from other GM divisions, but were otherwise entirely different engines.

Buick "Nailhead" V8 (first generation)

Buick's first generation of V8 was offered from 1953 through 1956. It was an OHV pushrod engine like the then-new Oldsmobile "Rocket" V8. While it was officially called by Buick the "Fireball V8" it became known as the "Nailhead" by enthusiasts for the unusual vertical alignment of its small-sized valves, features that were the result of putting both intake and exhaust valves on the intake manifold side of the "pent-roof combustion chamber" used in this engine series. (Originally, it was known to hot rodders as the “nail valve” because the valves had long stems and small heads which made them look like nails.) The small-diameter intake runners allowed these engines to develop high torque, with many exceeding 1 ft-lb/cu in, exceptional for the time. All of the nailhead designs have a  bore spacing. The high torque nature of the engine was developed to provide adequate acceleration when mated to the Dynaflow transmission which favored smoothness above most other design and marketing objectives. Dynaflow's non-shifting design was demonstrably smoother than the rough shifting automatics then available, to include GM's Hydramatic, and the Powerglide unit used by Chevrolet. After the war, manual transmissions fell out of fashion over and automatic transmissions were more popular.

264
The  produced in 1954 and 1955 was a direct replacement for the 263 straight-eight and the only engine available for the economy "Special" series during its run. The smallest displacement Nailhead, it is a small-bore version of the 322, sharing stroke and deck height, but having its own  bore.

322
The larger  was the original Nailhead, used by Buick from 1953 through 1956 in the Roadmaster, Super, and Century models, and the Special in 1956.

The 322 was also used in the 1956 through 1957 10,000-Series conventional-cab Chevrolet heavy duty trucks labeled as the Loadmaster.

Buick "Nailhead" V8 (second generation)
Buick's second variation of the nicknamed "Nailhead" was produced from 1957–1966, and the "Fireball" name was no longer used starting in 1958, and was very briefly called the "B-12000" referring to the 12,000 foot pounds generated by each piston.

364
The 364 was introduced in 1957 and produced through 1961.

401 (400)

Originally a 401, it was later redesignated a 400 to meet 1960s GM directives for maximum displacement engines in mid-size cars.

The 401/400 became Buick's full-sized and later intermediate muscle car powerplant of choice, used in the company's Skylark Gran Sport, Buick Sport Wagon and Buick Wildcat models, among others.  The engine was variously designated the Wildcat 375, Wildcat 410, and Wildcat 445 depending on the torque each version produced. The Wildcat 410 was the two-barrel carbureted engine, standard on the 1962-63 LeSabre. The Wildcat 375 was a no-cost option for the 1962-63 LeSabre that used a lower compression ratio to run on lower-octane fuel. The various Wildcat engines had decals on their air cleaners indicating their version; however, the four-barrel edition of the 1966-67 small-block Buick 340 V8 was also labeled Wildcat 375 on its air cleaner, but was not a Nailhead.

The Wildcat 445, with a single four-barrel carburetor, was the standard engine in the Invicta, 1959-1966 Electra, 1962–1966 Buick Wildcat, 1963 Riviera, and 1965 Riviera (the 1964 and 1966 Riviera models used the 425 with a single four-barrel carburetor, labeled Wildcat 465, as standard equipment).

In an effort to overcome the restrictive exhaust-port design of the Nailhead, Buick drag racing enthusiasts in the 1960s adapted superchargers with a custom camshaft to feed intake air in through the exhaust ports; the larger intake ports became the exhaust outlets.

425

The  was produced from 1963 to 1966. The largest-displacement version of the Nailhead, it began as an option on the 1963 Riviera, and was later available on the Wildcat and Electra models. The 1964 and 1966 Rivieras used the 425 engine as standard equipment. Mounted on a trolley, Buick 425s were also used as starter motors for the SR-71 Blackbird supersonic jet.

Four-barrel carburetion was standard on the basic 425, called the Wildcat 465 for the torque (as measured in lb-ft) it developed. The Super Wildcat (Regular Production Option {RPO}-coded Y48) was available on the 1965 Riviera Gran Sport and 1966 Wildcat GS, which included two four-barrel carburetors and matching intake manifold. Coded "MW", these parts were delivered in the car's trunk for dealer installation. Toward the end of the 1966 model year, around May 1966, Buick offered the Super Wildcat 465 with factory-installed dual four-barrel Carter AFB carburetors as an "MZ" option. Only 179 of the 1966 Riviera GS cars were built with the MZ package.

Buick small block

215
See also Rover V8 engine

In 1961, Buick unveiled an entirely new small V8 engine with aluminum cylinder heads and cylinder block. Lightweight and powerful, the aluminum V8 also spawned a turbocharged version, (only in the 1962–63 Oldsmobile Jetfire), which together with the turbocharged Corvair Spyder, also introduced in 1962, were the first ever offered in passenger cars. It became the basis of a highly successful cast iron V6 engine, the Fireball. The all-aluminum V8 engine was dropped after the 1963 model year, but was replaced with a very similar cast-iron block, aluminum head version for one year, and then in all-iron versions.

History
GM experimented with aluminum engines starting in the early 1950s. Aluminum Company of America (ALCOA) was pushing all automakers to use more aluminum. An early-development supercharged version of the  V8 was used in the 1951 Le Sabre concept car, and the 1953 Buick Roadmaster concept car, and work on a production unit commenced in 1956. Originally intended for  displacement, Buick was designated by GM as the engine design leader and decided to begin with a larger,  size, which was deemed ideal for the new senior compact cars introduced for the 1961 model year. This group of cars was commonly referred to as the B-O-P group — for Buick-Olds-Pontiac — or the Y-bodies.

At the time, the engine was the lightest mass-production V8 in the world, with a dry weight of only .

Oldsmobile and Pontiac each used an all-aluminum 215 on its senior compact cars, the Oldsmobile F-85, Cutlass, and Jetfire, and Pontiac Tempest and LeMans. Pontiac used the Buick version of the 215. At that time the engine was closely associated with the Buick brand, and Pontiac sold few cars with it, using it only in 1961 and 1962. The Oldsmobile version of this engine, although sharing the same basic architecture, had cylinder heads and angled valve covers designed by Oldsmobile engineers to look like a traditional Olds V8 and was produced on a separate assembly line. The major design differences were in the cylinder heads. Buick used a five-bolt pattern around each cylinder, while Oldsmobile used a six-bolt pattern and a wedge combustion chamber, which allowed larger valves. The sixth bolt was added to the intake manifold side of the head, one extra bolt for each cylinder, intended to alleviate a head-warping problem on high-compression versions. This meant that Buick heads would fit on Oldsmobile blocks, but not vice versa. Changing the compression ratio on an Oldsmobile 215 required changing the heads, but on a Buick 215, only the pistons were changed, which was less expensive and simpler. For that reason, the more common Buick version (which looks like a traditional Nailhead V8) has emerged as more desirable to some. The Oldsmobile wedge-shaped/quench combustion chambers/pistons are more compatible with modern low-octane/low-lead motor fuels than the Buick 'hemispherical'-shaped combustion chambers and domed pistons. The previous statement is incorrect, the 215 Buick only used "dished head" pistons even in the highest compression models, all Buick 215's have a 37-cc wedge combustion chamber. Later Rover versions of the aluminum block and subsequent Buick iron small-block 300s with aluminum, then iron heads, 34 (0 and 350 with iron heads) went to a four-bolt-per-cylinder pattern.

At introduction, Buick's 215 was rated  at 4400 rpm.

The two-barrel engine was unchanged.

The great expense of the aluminum engine led to its cancellation after the 1963 model year. The engine had an abnormally high scrap ratio due to hidden block-casting porosity problems, which caused serious oil leaks. Another problem was clogged radiators from antifreeze mixtures incompatible with aluminum. It was said that one of the major problems was because the factory had to make extensive use of air gauging to check for casting leaks during the manufacturing process and was unable to detect leaks on blocks that were as much as 95% complete. This raised the cost of complete engines to more than that of a comparable all cast-iron engine. Casting-sealing technology was not advanced enough at that time to prevent the high scrap rates.

The 215's very high power-to-weight ratio made it immediately interesting for automobile and boat racing. Mickey Thompson entered a stock-block 215-powered car in the 1962 Indianapolis 500. From 1946-1962, there had not been a single stock-block car in this race. In 1962, the 215 was the only non-Offenhauser-powered entry in the field. Rookie driver Dan Gurney qualified eighth and raced well for 92 laps before retiring with transmission problems.

Surplus engine blocks of the Oldsmobile F85 version formed the basis of the Australian Formula One Repco V8 used by Brabham to win the 1966 Formula One world championship, although only the earliest engines had any Oldsmobile components. The majority of Repco RB620 engines were cast and built in-house at Repco.

Rights to these engines were purchased by the British Rover Company and used in the 1967 Rover P5B that replaced the 3 L straight six Rover engined P5. Throughout the years, the Rover Company (which became part of British Leyland in 1968), and its successor companies constantly improved the engine making it much stronger and more reliable. This engine was used for V8 versions of the MGB GT known as the GTV8. Rover also used the engine in the 1970 Range Rover. Morgan used the Rover version in its Plus 8. American 215s have also been engine swapped into countless other platforms, especially Chevrolet Vegas and later British cars including the MG RV8 in the 1990s, Triumph TR8, and various sports sedans and sports cars by the MG Rover Group and specialist manufacturers such as TVR. The engine remains well-supported by enthusiast clubs, specialist parts suppliers, and by shops that specialize in conversions and tuning.

It could also be fitted with high-compression cylinder heads from the Morgan Plus 8.

300

In 1964, Buick replaced the 215 with an iron-block engine of very similar architecture.

The four-barrel option was cancelled for 1966, and the 300 was replaced entirely by the 350 in 1968.

In 1964, while nearly all Buick engines were painted "Buick Late Green", the 300ci V8s were painted Silver instead. In 1966 Buick engines switched to "Buick Late Red", but until 1967 at least, the 300 V8 (and the 225) were still painted Buick Late Green. The Apollo 5000 GT sports car, (also sold as the Vetta Ventura) used this engine.

340
It was only produced through 1967, being replaced by the new small block  in 1968.

350

Buick adopted the popular  size in 1968 for their final family of V8 engines, the 350, which was produced through 1980. Although it shared the displacement of the other GM small blocks, including the Chevrolet 350, Oldsmobile 350, and Pontiac 350 (although the Pontiac was technically a 354), the Buick blocks were of a substantially different proprietary company design. The Buick 350 featured the same  bore as the  version of the Buick 90° V6 and retained the  stroke of the previous  V8.

The major differences of the 350 in comparison to other GM V8s are Buick's "deep-skirt" engine block construction, the use of cast iron with increased nickel content, an external oil pump, a forward-mounted distributor, under-square cylinder bore sizing,  crankshaft main journals, and  connecting rods. The Buick 350 also shares an integrated aluminum timing cover, which incorporates the oil pump mechanisms, leaving the oil filter exposed to oncoming air for added cooling. The engine garnered a reputation as rugged and durable, and some of its design characteristics are found in other Buick-designed GM engines, such as the  V6 and its 3800 descendants. Of all the GM "350s", the Buick has the longest piston stroke. This design characteristic made the engine significantly wider than the others — essentially the same as the Buick big-blocks, which have the shortest stroke of the GM big-blocks.

The 350 was used by Kaiser-Jeep and AMC Jeep in the Jeep Gladiator and Wagoneer models from 1968–71; in these applications, the engine was billed as the Dauntless V8.
 

 1968-1972 Buick Skylark
 1968-1972 Buick Sport Wagon
 1968-1971 Jeep Wagoneer
 1968-1971 Jeep Gladiator
 1971-1973 Buick Centurion
 1971-1980 Buick Electra
 1971-1980 Buick LeSabre
 1973-1975 Buick Apollo
 1973-1977 Buick Century
 1973-1977 Buick Regal
 1975 Pontiac Ventura
 1975-1979 Buick Skylark
 1977-1980 Buick Estate
 1977-1978 Buick Riviera

Buick big block
Buick introduced a "big block" V8 in 1967 to replace the largest displacement nailheads. It retained a  cylinder bore spacing, and was produced in three  displacements, 400, 430, and 455, through 1976.

400
The  was produced from 1967-1969. It was the only large V8 engine available for the intermediate-sized A-body Buicks due to the GM cubic inch limit restriction in effect through 1970. Most parts except the pistons interchange with the 430 and 455. This 400 engine had the distributor towards the front of the engine, as opposed to the 401/400 nailhead, which had its near the firewall.

430

The  was only produced from 1967 until 1969. This engine was used in large B-, C- and E-body Buicks. Most parts except the pistons interchange with the 400 and 455.

Applications:
1967-1969 Buick Electra
1967-1969 Buick Riviera
1967-1969 Buick Wildcat

455

Most parts (except pistons and heads) interchange between the 400 and the 430. The regular 455 produced a rated  of torque at 2,800 rpm, more than any other muscle car engine. The horsepower was somewhat reduced in 1971 mainly due to the reduction in cylinder compression ratio, a change which was mandated by GM in order to cope with the introduction of new federal laws which would require new cars to use low octane gasoline in an effort to reduce exhaust emissions. Unleaded gasoline and catalytic converters came into play in 1975 for all US manufactured cars. Tightening emissions controls would cause the engine to drop in power still further, a little at a time, through 1976.

The 455 was one of the first "thin-wall casting" engine blocks at GM, and because of this advance in production technology, it weighs significantly less than other engines of comparable size (for example,  less than a Chevrolet 454 and only  more than a Chevrolet 350).

Applications:
1970-1976 Buick Electra
1970-1976 Buick Estate
1970-1976 Buick LeSabre
1970-1976 Buick Riviera
1970-1972 Buick Skylark
1970 Buick Wildcat
1971-1973 Buick Centurion
1973-1974 Buick Century
1973-1974 Buick Gran Sport
1973-1974 Buick Regal

GM V8s
In the mid-1970s Buick's 400/430/455 big blocks became unable to meet fuel economy/emission requirements and were phased out, with the Buick 350 remaining as a factory option until 1980. In their place were a variety of GM V8s were offered, both as standard equipment and factory options.  These included:

260
The  was an Oldsmobile V8 engine shared with Buick:
1975–1977 Buick Skylark

301
The  was a Pontiac V8 engine shared with Buick.

305
The  was a Chevrolet V8 engine shared with Buick:
1978–1987 Buick Regal
1975–1979 Buick Skylark

307
The  was an Oldsmobile V8 engine shared with Buick:
1980–1985 Buick Lesabre
1980–1984 Buick Electra
1980–1985 Buick Riviera
1980–1990 Buick Estate Wagon
1986–1987 Buick Regal

403
The  was an Oldsmobile V8 engine shared with Buick:
1977 Buick Century estate
1977–1979 Buick Riviera
1977–1979 Buick Electra
1977–1979 Buick Estate Wagon
1977–1979 Buick LeSabre

See also

Buick V6 engine

From the 1950s-1970s, each GM division had its own V8 engine family. Many were shared among other divisions, but each design is most-closely associated with its own division:
Cadillac V8 engine
Chevrolet Small-Block engine
Chevrolet Big-Block engine
Oldsmobile V8 engine
Pontiac V8 engine
Holden V8 engine

GM later standardized on the later generations of the Chevrolet design:
GM LT engine — Generation II small-block
GM LS engine — Generation III/IV small-block
List of GM engines

References

V8
Buick 350
V8 engines